Rosanna Maria Assunta Costa Costa (Viña del Mar, 6 December 1957) is a Chilean economist, academic and researcher. Currently Governor of the Central Bank of Chile, she was the head of the Ministry of Finance's Budget Office during the first presidency of Sebastián Piñera (2010-2014).

Professional career 
She moved to the capital when she was young. She studied at the Saint Gabriel School and then Economics at the Pontifical Catholic University of Chile following in the footsteps of her father, Horacio, who also studied for the same career before working at the state petroleum company Empresa Nacional del Petróleo (Enap). Among her generation colleagues were Felipe Larrain and Francisco Pérez Mackenna.

In 1984 she begins to work at the Central Bank of Chile (Banco Central de Chile) in the National Accounts Department. Afterwards she moved to Studies, where she met economists Juan Andrés Fontaine and Francisco Rosende. One of her tasks was to coordinate with the International Monetary Fund that the limits imposed are respected during the time Chile has an agreement with the organisation.  She also led the monetary program team. 

Costa started working in 1992 at the Freedom and Development Institute (Instituto Libertad y Desarrollo) neoliberal think-thank, focusing on investigation in the macroeconomic, fiscal, judicial and labor fields. She was a member of the Pension Reform Commission and the Equity Commission, both formed by president Michelle Bachelet.

References

20th-century Chilean economists
Chilean journalists
Living people
1957 births
21st-century Chilean economists